Edward Alacampe (1581 – 6 February 1646), an English Jesuit, became a member of the English College, Rome in 1605. Three years later he entered the Society of Jesus; in 1614, he was at the new college in Liège. Afterwards, he held the office of procurator at Rome, and died in the house of probation at Ghent.

See also

References

1581 births
1646 deaths
17th-century English Jesuits
English College, Rome alumni